Maji ya Chai is an administrative ward in the Meru District  of the Arusha Region of Tanzania. The ward is home to the University of Arusha is also where the gate of Arusha National Park is located.  According to the 2012 census, the ward has a total population of 29,313. Thus making the ward the most populous in Meru district.

Etymology 
The name of the ward  in Swahili  means 'tea water' based on the river that flows through the village is a red brown color which resembles brewed tea. This comes from the geological conditions of Mt. Meru.

References

Wards of Meru District
Wards of Arusha Region